William Marsh Rice (March 14, 1816 – September 23, 1900) was an American businessman who bequeathed his fortune to found Rice University in Houston, Texas. Rice was murdered by his valet Charles F. Jones while sleeping. The murder was part of a plot to forge Rice's will. The instigator of the murder, attorney Albert T. Patrick, was sentenced to death.

Early life
Rice was born on March 14, 1816, in Springfield, Massachusetts, the third of ten children of David and Patty (née Hall) Rice. His first job was as a grocery store clerk in Springfield, at the age of 15. By age 22, he had purchased the store from its owner. Around 1837, Rice traveled to Texas in search of new business opportunities. He started in Texas as a bartender at Milam House in Houston. Unfortunately, all the merchandise from his store was lost at sea, and Rice was forced to start anew in Houston as a clerk. He soon set up the Rice and Nichols general store with his business partner Ebenezer Nichols. This business was the foundation for what would later become William M. Rice and Company.

Later life 
Rice made his fortune by investing in land, real estate, lumber, railroads, cotton, and other prospects in Texas and Louisiana. In 1860, his total property, which included fifteen slaves, was worth $750,000. He invested in business firms in Houston; in 1895 he was listed in the city directories as "Capitalist. Owner of Capitol Hotel and Capitol Hotel Annex Building, President of Houston Brick Works Company." Rice was a member of the Independent Order of Odd Fellows.

Rice married Margaret Bremond, daughter of Paul Bremond (Houston and Texas Central Railway) and Harriet Martha Sprouls, in 1850 in Houston, Texas. The 1860 census places William and Margaret Rice in Houston's 2nd Ward. Clerks are also identified in the same census report; thus the location is most likely Rice's merchant business. Margaret was 16 years Rice's junior. She died, at age 31, in 1863 in Houston, Texas. Rice is also reported to have lived in Matamoros, Mexico, in 1863. Whether there is a connection to the timing of Margaret's death to his living in Matamoros is not clear. By 1865, he was reported as living back in Houston. While living in Houston, Rice served on the Harris County Slave Patrol.

He lived in Houston until around 1865, when he moved to New York (but did not own a home there). He built a house on a  estate in Dunellen, New Jersey, and moved there in 1872. He became a resident of New York again in 1882.

Rice married Julia E. Brown (nee Elizabeth Baldwin) on June 26, 1867. Baldwin was the sister of Charlotte Rice, the wife of William Rice's brother Frederick. The marriage was "stormy", and during the 1890s, she consulted an attorney regarding the possibility of a divorce. She died "hopelessly insane" in Waukesha, Wisconsin, on July 24, 1896.

Rice was an eccentric. In his later years, he ate no meat and rarely any vegetables. His diet consisted of bouillon and eggs. On January 28, 1882, William Rice drafted a will, instructing the executors to pay over to the trustees, the Governor and the Judge, funds from his estate for the establishment of "The William M. Rice Orphans Institute." The next year, he began spending more time in Houston, reuniting with old acquaintances. After an 1886 or 1887 meeting with a C. Lombardi, Rice decided that the benefits of his wealth should be enjoyed by the children of the city where he made his fortune. In 1891, Rice decided that he would not establish an Orphans Institute at the Dunellen estate, but would instead found the William M. Rice Institute for the Advancement of Literature, Science and Art in Houston, Texas. The Institute's charter was signed by all the original trustees, except for Rice, on May 18, 1891, and certified by the State of Texas the following day.

Death and scandal
Rice was the victim of one of the earliest sensational crimes of the 1900s. In 1893, Rice made a new will, naming as executors Captain James A. Baker, a lawyer who often worked for him, William M. Rice Jr., his nephew, and John D. Bartine. The value of Rice's estate at the time was estimated at about $4 million. The new will instructed the executors to divide his property into two equal parts, one to be bequeathed to the Rice Institute, the other to be divided into shares and distributed to his wife Elizabeth Baldwin Rice and other legatees. After her death in 1896, a new will was drafted on September 26, providing bequests for several of Rice's relatives and leaving the remainder of the estate to the Rice Institute. The next four years saw a great deal of litigation by the will of Elizabeth Rice. Its executor was O. T. Holt, assisted by Albert T. Patrick, formerly an attorney in Houston, but working in New York at the time. Under a false identity, Patrick interviewed Rice, who would not otherwise have seen him due to his professional relationship with Elizabeth Rice. Patrick was attempting to establish Rice's domicile in Texas, and not in New York, which would have provided a more favorable bequest for Mrs. Rice. Despite revealing his identity in 1900, to Rice's anger, the two men continued to have dealings.

Plotting to take control of Rice's estate and become the beneficiary of his fortune, Patrick prepared a fake will, forging Rice's signature on it. The fraudulent document named William Rice Jr. and James Baker Jr. as executors, but replaced John Bartine's name with Patrick's. He made bequests to a number of relatives and friends of Rice and of his own, hoping to involve as many interested parties as possible. In the words of James A. Baker Sr.:

William Rice was living alone in his apartment at 500 Madison Avenue, New York. His butler and valet, Charles F. Jones, had worked for him for a number of years.

On September 24, 1900, James Baker received a telegram from Jones, stating:

Despite the contents of this telegram, a second communique, from Rice's bankers warned that the multi-millionaire had died under peculiar circumstances, and that his body was to be cremated.

On September 23, 1900, Rice was found dead by Charles Jones. Rice was presumed to have died in his sleep. Shortly thereafter, a bank teller noticed a suspiciously large check bearing the late Rice's signature and made out to Rice's New York City lawyer, Albert T. Patrick, but with Albert's name misspelled "Abert". Soon, Patrick made an announcement that Rice had changed his will right before his death, leaving the bulk of his fortune to Patrick rather than to his Institute. A subsequent investigation led by the District Attorney of New York resulted in the arrests of Patrick and of Jones, who had been persuaded to administer chloroform to Rice while he slept.

Court action would later prove that Jones and Patrick had conspired to murder Rice on September 23. The will was proved a forgery. Patrick was sentenced to death, spending four years on death row at Sing Sing Prison before having his sentence commuted by Governor Frank Higgins in 1906. He received a full pardon from Governor John A. Dix six years later. Patrick died in Tulsa, Oklahoma on February 11, 1940, aged 74. Charles Jones was given freedom, and remained in seclusion until November 16, 1954. On that date, at age 79, he committed suicide in Baytown, Texas, where he lived.

Rice's body was eventually cremated, and the urn of his ashes was kept in the vault of the business office of the Trustees of the Institute until it was deposited beneath the monument erected in his memory on the campus of the Institute. In 1930 John Angel completed the Founder's Memorial at Rice University  depicting a seated William Marsh Rice  in line with specifications by architect Ralph Adams Cram.

Legacy
Rice left the bulk of his estate to the founding of a free institute of higher education in Houston, Texas. Opening in 1912 as William Marsh Rice Institute for the Advancement of Letters, Science, and Art, it is known today as Rice University.  In his will, Rice mandated that the university to bear his name would be for "the white men and women of Houston." This request was eventually overruled, and Raymond L. Johnson  Rice University's first black student  was admitted in 1964.

The Rice School in Houston is also named after William Marsh Rice.

A film, The Trust, depicts the story of William Marsh Rice's murder and the role of his attorney, James A. Baker Sr., in uncovering the truth.

References

External links

 William Marsh Rice Collection, Houston Metropolitan Research Center, Houston Public Library
 
 Guide to the William Marsh Rice business and estate ledgers, 1855–1965 (Woodson Research Center, Fondren Library, Rice University, Houston, TX, USA)
 Guide to the William M. Rice family collection, 1880–1941 (Woodson Research Center, Fondren Library, Rice University, Houston, TX, USA)

1816 births
1900 deaths
1900 murders in the United States
American real estate businesspeople
Businesspeople from Houston
Philanthropists from Texas
Rice University people
People from Dunellen, New Jersey
Businesspeople from Springfield, Massachusetts
History of Houston
19th-century American businesspeople
Deaths by poisoning
American murder victims
People murdered in New York City
Male murder victims
Philanthropists from Massachusetts
Philanthropists from New Jersey
University and college founders
Rice University trustees
19th-century American philanthropists
Members of the Odd Fellows
People of the Republic of Texas